Tadija Tadić (born April 22, 1999) is a Serbian professional basketball player for Zlatibor the Basketball League of Serbia.

Professional career
On September 8, 2017, Tadić signed a four-year contract with the Partizan NIS from Belgrade.

In April 2022, Zlatibor won the ABA League Second Division for the 2021–22 season following a 78–73 overtime win over MZT Skopje Aerodrom.

National team career 
Tadić was a member of the Serbian U-18 national basketball team that won the gold medal at the 2017 FIBA Europe Under-18 Championship. Over seven tournament games, he averaged 3.1 points, 2.4 rebounds and 1.3 assists per game. He also represented Serbia men's national under-16 team at the 2015 Championship. Over eight games he averaged 4.6 points, 2.0 rebounds and 1.9 assists per game. Tadić was a member of the Serbian under-20 team that finished 15th at the 2019 FIBA U20 European Championship in Tel Aviv, Israel. Over three tournament games, he averaged 0.7 rebounds and 1 assist per game.

References

External links
 Profile at KK Partizan official website
 Profile at realgm.com

1999 births
Living people
ABA League players
Basketball players from Belgrade
Basketball League of Serbia players
KK Mladost Zemun players
KK Partizan players
KK Sloboda Užice players
KK Zlatibor players
Serbian men's basketball players
Point guards